Havok (Alexander Summers) is a fictional character appearing in American comic books published by Marvel Comics, commonly in association with the X-Men. He first appears in The X-Men #54 (March 1969), and was created by writer Arnold Drake and penciller Don Heck. Havok generates powerful "plasma blasts", an ability he has had difficulty controlling. One of the sons of Corsair, he is the younger brother of the X-Men's Cyclops, and the older brother of Vulcan. He often resents Cyclops's authoritarian attitude and reputation as a model member of the X-Men.

In contrast, Havok and his longtime love interest Polaris have had a love-hate relationship with the team, often finding themselves roped into it. Both were also members of the 1990s-era Pentagon-sponsored mutant team X-Factor. After X-Factor disbanded, Havok starred in Mutant X, a series in which he explored a strange alternate reality. He has since returned to the X-Men, later taking over his father's role as leader of the Starjammers to bring Vulcan's reign over the Shi'ar to an end.

In 2013, ComicsAlliance ranked Havok as #44 on their list of the "50 Sexiest Male Characters in Comics". Lucas Till played Havok in the films X-Men: First Class (2011), X-Men: Days of Future Past (2014), and X-Men: Apocalypse (2016).

Publication history

Created by writer Arnold Drake and artist Don Heck, Havok first appeared in X-Men #54 (March 1969). He is typically portrayed as struggling under the shadow of his more esteemed brother.

In the 2012 relaunch of Marvel comic books, Havok led a team called the Uncanny Avengers, a mix of the X-Men and the Avengers teams.

Fictional character biography

Origins
Alexander Summers was born in Honolulu, Hawaii. He is the second of the three known sons of Christopher Summers, a United States Air Force Major and test pilot, and his wife Katherine Anne. When Alex was a boy growing up in Anchorage, Alaska, United States, his father took the family for a flight in their airplane, which came under attack by a Shi'ar spaceship. As the plane caught fire and was crashing, his parents fastened Alex and his older brother Scott into a parachute and pushed them off the plane in hopes that they would survive. His brother hit his head and was in a coma for a short while.

The Summers boys were recovered and put into an orphanage and Alex was soon adopted though Scott remained there for much of his childhood. Alex was raised by the Blandings whose son Todd had died in a car accident. They tried to make Alex fit into the image of their son, and he tried to do as best he could. When the boy responsible for Todd's death kidnapped Alex and his foster sister, Haley, Alex manifested his powers for the first time, incinerating the boy. Mister Sinister, an evil geneticist who was obsessed with the Summers bloodline, appeared eager yet surprised that Alex's potential exceeded Scott's – despite the fact that he seemed to lack control over his gift. Sinister placed psi-blocks on both Alex and Haley's minds, causing them to forget what had happened that night.

First encounter with X-Men
Alex went on to study and earn a degree in geophysics at college. There he first met the original X-Men, and learned that Cyclops is his brother. His mutant powers became apparent when he was kidnapped by the Living Pharaoh, who declared Alex the only being able to rival his power. The two shared the same cosmic energy-absorption abilities, in reverse proportion to each other. By locking Alex in a shielded cell, the Pharaoh was able to absorb enough cosmic energy to become the Living Monolith. The X-Men fought a losing battle against the virtually unstoppable Monolith, until Alex managed to free himself, and the Monolith turned back into the Living Pharaoh.

Alex's mutant power at first seemed to manifest itself only when he was near death. He was unable to control it, and feared its immense power.

Alex was later captured by Larry Trask and his Sentinels, who were bent on controlling or eradicating all mutants. Trask fashioned a costume for Alex that would help him control his powers and Alex was given the code name Havok. Trask turned out to be a mutant himself and the Sentinels were defeated by the X-Men. Havok lost control of his powers, however, and his excess energy was absorbed by Sauron. Havok then gained control of his powers.

Havok actively joined the X-Men team, and began a relationship with Lorna Dane/Polaris, much to the anger of Iceman who was romantically interested in her as well. While the senior X-Men were in the Savage Land, Havok and Polaris were approached by Professor X about the imminent invasion of the alien Z’Nox. During this time, the couple fell in love.

With the original X-Men, Havok and Polaris were captured by Krakoa the living island, but were rescued by the new X-Men. Havok and Polaris then quit the team's active membership along with most of the original members.

Havok was again captured by the Living Pharaoh, and was this time rescued by Spider-Man and Thor.

Havok and Polaris were occasional members and allies of the X-Men for years. They alternated between doing graduate work and earning a postgraduate degree in the American Southwest – where they occasionally encountered the Hulk – and helping out Moira MacTaggert at her facility for genetic research on Muir Island, off the coast of Scotland. It was during their stay on Muir Island that Havok helped the X-Men battle Proteus.

Eventually, Alex learned that Corsair of the Starjammers was really his father.

During one of their adventures, Polaris was possessed by the mutant Marauder Malice, ending the romantic relationship for a time. Havok then sought out and rejoined the X-Men.

Wolverine and the X-Men
During this period, Havok became involved with Madelyne Pryor. Both of them had been rejected by their previous lovers: Pryor's then-husband Cyclops had left her for Jean Grey. Madelyne was manipulated by N'astirh and became the Goblin Queen. She attempted to use Havok to help take over the world and transform it into a demonic realm. Havok eventually came to his senses and Madelyne killed herself after discovering she was a clone of Jean Grey.

Havok befriended Wolverine and others, then they shared adventures. While they were vacationing in Mexico, they were targeted by a terrorist cell. They defeated the cell, but were fooled by a damsel in distress who was actually a member of the terrorist group. Havok woke up in a hospital, in the care of nurse Scarlett McKenzie, the assassin without disguise. She manipulated Havok and made him fall in love with her. Scarlett was working for the Russian terrorists, Dr. Neutron and Meltdown. Having previously failed to charge up Meltdown's superpowers with the energy released from Chernobyl nuclear disaster, they wanted to use Havok as a conduit to channel the energy of an atomic reactor into Meltdown. Scarlett fed Havok with false information that terrorists were trying to sabotage a nuclear power station. When he ventured into the heart of the reactor, he found it reaching critical limit. According to plan, Havok tried to absorb the dangerous radiation; however, when he witnessed Meltdown killing Scarlett, he unleashed the energy into Meltdown bringing him up to full power. Wolverine arrived and prevented a full disaster by battling with Meltdown, while Havok continued to absorb energy from the reactor, still on the verge of explosion. Wolverine killed Meltdown by penetrating his body with multiple control rods that slowed down the nuclear reactions raging within him, and Havok redirected the nuclear radiation into space.

Genosha
Havok ultimately went through the Siege Perilous with several other X-Men fleeing the Reavers, the cyborg hunters. Havok ended up an amnesiac in Genosha, a country that used mutants and genetically-engineered slaves called Mutates. He became a high-ranking Magistrate in the Genoshan army. His fellow X-Men had no idea what had happened to him until, during the X-Tinction Agenda, the Genoshan government kidnapped members of the mutant teams X-Men, X-Factor and the New Mutants. During a pitched battle with Cyclops, Havok's memory returned, but he kept it a secret hoping to catch the Genoshan leader, Cameron Hodge, off guard. He succeeded and delivered the killing blow to Hodge, yet he and Wolfsbane decided to remain in Genosha, as they wanted to help in rebuilding the once proud nation.

X-Factor
Havok and Wolfsbane were soon brought back from Genosha by Professor X and Cyclops as they wanted him to become the leader of the new government-sponsored X-Factor. He reunited with Polaris and Havok led the team effectively for quite some time. He dealt with the unwilling, unwitting affections of Wolfsbane, the physical problems of Strong Guy and various public relations disasters, such as the destruction of the Washington Monument. Much of the team's bad image was orchestrated by Mister Sinister, his Nasty Boys and a mutant senator who could cause bad luck. He dealt physically with Random and personally, as they clashed for various reasons. He grew in new directions as a leader, once seemingly drinking poison in an effort to buck up the spirits of Strong Guy, who had been poisoned. (What Alex drank had been water).

Havok and X-Factor were called on to subvert a civil war aggravated by the Pantheon. In this instance, Alex physically challenged the Hulk. He soaked up the various energies that fuel Hulk and used them to bolster his plasma blasts, thereby gaining an advantage. It was the second time Havok had beaten the Hulk.

During this time, Havok's team participated in the events of the Infinity War and the Infinity Crusade. Alex and Strong Guy participated the most in far reaching, reality altering cosmic battles.

Multiple Man had contracted the Legacy Virus in Genosha and later chose to undergo a seemingly mystical healing effort. Despite the procedure's previous success with Wolfsbane, curing her of her unnatural love for Alex, Multiple Man perished. This hit Havok hard, as he felt responsible since Madrox was under his command. He left the team for Hawaii, where he and Polaris enjoyed a romantic honeymoon until Malice, Mr. Sinister and The Nasty Boys showed up. Reinforcements helped Havok and Polaris survive the villains. Shortly afterward, Strong Guy suffered a heart attack and ended up in stasis, and Wolfsbane left to be with her foster mother.

After the Age of Apocalypse event, Havok accidentally destroyed a dam and was forced back into his old containment suit. After new members Wild Child, Shard and Mystique were introduced to the team, Havok fought Random and was captured by the Dark Beast. He was brainwashed into serving Dark Beast and Onslaught. He broke free of the brainwashing, but used it as an opportunity to infiltrate the enemy and recreated a version of the Brotherhood of Mutants. He succeeded in defeating Dark Beast and attempted to mend fences with his former X-Factor teammates, specifically Polaris and Multiple Man (the man who had died had been a Madrox duplicate).

While Havok was attempting to reform X-Factor, one of his time-traveling team members, Greystone, created an experimental time travel device to return him to the future. It exploded in mid-air, seemingly killing Havok and Greystone in front of their teammates.

Mutant X

In actuality, Havok was cast into a parallel world where he was the leader of a drastically altered version of X-Factor, known as The Six. In this world, he was the leader of the original X-Men, since his brother Cyclops was abducted by the Shi'ar along with his parents. He found he was married to Madelyne Pryor, with whom he had a son named Scotty, and all his friends were twisted versions of the ones he knew. Despite being unfamiliar with this realm, Havok willingly took over the role of father for Scotty, though the boy knew he was not really his dad. Havok becomes leader of The Six and his adventures in this reality lead to a disaster which leaves most of the superhumans dead. Havok is able to save the world itself before being cast into black nothingness.

Resurrection
However, Havok was found back in the original reality in a coma. The X-Men were able to restore his psyche with the help of the son of Havok's nurse, Annie Ghazikhanian. When he was reunited with Polaris, she asked him to marry her, to which he did not respond. Beast immediately congratulated them, and Havok said nothing further. Likely he felt he should want to marry Lorna, but did not love her as he had before. Unknown to Havok, Polaris, and Annie, Carter had used his telepathy to link Annie and Alex's dreams while Alex was comatose. In their dreams, Havok and Annie fell in love, unknown to Alex but not Annie. Before his wedding, Scott tested Alex's resolve by hiring a shapeshifter to morph into Annie, something that disturbed Alex very deeply. The night before the wedding, Alex had a dream convincing him that he now loved Annie. During the wedding, Alex stopped the proceedings and called off the marriage. Lorna, already affected by the incident at Genosha, tried to kill Annie and Carter, only to be stopped by Juggernaut and Havok. 

Alex revealed to Annie that it was Carter who linked the two due to their loneliness and that Alex loved her. Despite the fact that Iceman had started a relationship with Annie, he expressed his feelings for Lorna.

Havok and Annie's relationship continued until an impending attack on the X-Mansion at the hands of a new Brotherhood of Mutants led by Exodus. This caused Annie to leave Havok and take her son away from the X-Men, feeling it was no longer safe for the two to live at the mansion. She wanted Alex to come with them but his duty was to his team, so mother and son left for parts unknown.

Decimation
With Annie and Carter now gone, Havok's mind seems to be mending, since he expressed feelings to resume his relationship with Polaris, who moved on after being rejected and was dating her former boyfriend Iceman. During the post-"House of M" storyline titled "Decimation," many mutants lost their powers. When Polaris revealed that she had lost her powers, she left the X-Men, and Havok decided to leave with her. However, after he and Polaris encountered the creature called "Daap", during which Lorna was abducted, Havok returned to the X-Mansion to see a sphinx bearing the face of Apocalypse.

He then returned to active duty to bring down Apocalypse with the remainder of his squad, composed of Rogue, Iceman, and new member Mystique. Havok single-handedly destroyed the antidote to Apocalypse's meta-plague, which had been a key element in his plan to decimate the human population. Gambit was turned into a horseman and clashed with Havok and the other X-Men. During the last battle, Iceman struck down Polaris's Pestilence form. As her esophagus closed down, Havok administered CPR to save her life but was infected with the meta-plague. Luckily, Emma Frost had saved some of the antidote that Havok destroyed earlier and cured him with it.

The rise and fall of the Shi'ar Empire
Havok was recruited by Professor X, along with Marvel Girl (Rachel Summers), Nightcrawler, Warpath, Darwin, and Polaris to participate in a space mission to stop Vulcan from unleashing his powers on the Shi'ar empire. Havok had recently been reunited with Corsair, his father, and brought him news about Vulcan. His current relationship with Polaris is still developing. Polaris seems to finally show concrete signs of forgiving Havok, telling him to "just shut up and kiss" her after the team won their first battle against the entire regiment of Shi'ar soldiers in their beginning struggle against D'Ken and in support of Lilandra. Although Havok initially rebuffs her advances, hesitant to "start up again after" everything that happened between them, Lorna says that he needs to "blow off some steam" and the scene ends with them kissing. During the final battle, Corsair tries to reason with his son Vulcan but Vulcan kills his father where he stands. Havok, enraged by this, launches an attack on his brother with intention of killing him but is easily defeated. In the end, Nightcrawler, Warpath, and Hepzibah get the injured Professor X and Darwin back to the ship, but Lilandra sends the ship back to Earth, leaving Havok and his teammates stranded.

Havok, along with Polaris, Rachel, Korvus, Ch'od, and Raza form a new team of Starjammers after the death of Corsair, dedicated to defeating Vulcan and restoring Lilandra to the throne.

Starjammers
The civil war between Vulcan's forces and those loyal to the dethroned Lilandra rages on. Led by Havok and the Starjammers, Lilandra's forces gradually whittle away at Vulcan's forces, which are plagued by defections. The Shi'ar, contrary to Vulcan's expectations, are not happy to have an outsider as their ruler. Vulcan is discouraged by this, but Deathbird convinces him that they will come to accept him.

Warned in advance of a rebel raid on Feather's Edge, Vulcan and his fleet ambush the Starjammers. However, in the middle of the battle, his ship, the Hammer, is destroyed by the Scy'ar Tal (translates as "Death to the Shi'ar"). Vulcan and Gladiator attack the leader of the Scy'ar Tal and are easily defeated, whereupon they retreat deeper into Shi'ar space. Marvel Girl makes contact with the Eldest Scy'ar Tal and discovers their true origin. The Scy'ar Tal were originally called the M'Kraan. Early in their history, the Shi'ar attacked them and killed a great number of their people, making the rest flee for their lives. Eventually, the Shi'ar settled on their planet, took the M'Kraan Crystal as their own, and passed down the legend of the M'Kraan Crystal as a sacred gift from their deities, Sharra and K'ythri. The M'Kraan then changed their name to Scy'ar Tal and devoted their culture and society to the destruction of the Shi'ar Empire. With their first attack, they destroyed Feather's Edge by transporting a star to obliterate it. After that, Vulcan makes contact with the Starjammers to call a temporary ceasefire.

Under the ceasefire, the Shi'ar and the Starjammers decide to take out the Finality, thus crippling the Scy'ar's biggest threat. Once Havok and Vulcan are in a position to destroy Finality, the Eldest Scy'ar tries to stop them. When Vulcan figures out how the Eldest is powered, he severs the connection that Eldest has with his brothers, making him powerless. Once the connection is severed, the Scy'ar become unorganized and the tide of the battle shifts to the Shi'ar. The Shi'ar then proceed to attack both the Scy'ar and the Starjammers. Meanwhile, Vulcan blasts Havok into a sun.

Vulcan decides to use Finality to destroy the Scy'ar by using the weapon to place a star in the middle of their fleet. Alex returns and, having absorbed enough power to burn Vulcan, decides to end things with him. While they battle, Rachel and Korvus try but fail to stop the beacon that will initiate the attack by the Shi'ar. The Shi'ar Imperial Guard end Alex's battle with Vulcan by appearing with the Starjammers in captivity, threatening to kill them. Before surrendering, Alex destroys Finality. Alex and the Starjammers are then taken into Vulcan's custody and placed in prison, while Rachel Summers remains free.

Divided We Stand
Alex and Lorna are tortured daily and forced to hear each other's screams, and Alex is powerless as he's nowhere near a star from which to draw his powers. Vulcan informs Havok of the events of Messiah Complex and that the baby is gone, Charles Xavier is dead, and the X-Men are no more (not knowing the full truth of the result). Alex laughs off Vulcan, seeing the baby as a beacon of hope.

X-Men: Kingbreaker and War of Kings
Despite ploys such as telling Havok that his teammates are dead and it was all Alex's fault, Havok remains defiant. Alex Summers was last seen displaying energy coming from his left hand proving that he had at least some power left.

Havok allowed some time to go by, allegedly with these moments of exposure continuing, before making his move. Waiting until it was his mealtime and the guards slid the food through the door, he blasted it open, warning the guards to run. When they instead attacked, he mercilessly defeated them, killing both. Alex then raced into the depths of the complex searching for his teammates.

He had no problem locating the cells of his crew and liberating them from captivity. He then went in search of Lorna, defeating more guards along the way. Alex, with Raza and Ch'od in tow, made it to Lorna's lab where Alex set her free. After receiving a thank-you kiss upon waking her, Havok surprised his team as he informed them of his true plan. Instead of running, they would wait; Vulkan would be coming to defeat them and Havok planned to kill him when he did.

Realm of Kings
Due to the incident of Rachel and Korvus both losing their connection to the Phoenix Force, Havok, Polaris, Rachel and Korvus have departed for Earth. According to Rachel, they are still "half a universe away" from Earth. Havok, Polaris, and Rachel return in X-Men Legacy #254, in which Rogue launches a rescue mission after Rachel sends a telepathic distress signal. Frenzy, Magneto, Gambit, and Rogue help de-brainwash Polaris and Havok from the mental control of the insect-like alien "Friendless".

Regenesis
Havok and Polaris are seen joining Wolverine's side due to Polaris wanting to keep herself away from her father Magneto. Shortly after they arrived back on Earth, the duo is encouraged by Wolverine to lead X-Factor Investigations after Jamie Madrox's death. Jamie returns to life shortly after, but Havok remains with X-Factor for a while.  Polaris decides to remain with the team even after he leaves.

Uncanny Avengers
During Avengers vs. X-Men, Havok joined the Avengers, the X-Men, and Nova in the final battle against his brother. He is asked to lead the Avengers Unity Squad by Captain America, reasoning that the mutant race needs a new 'spokesperson' with Xavier dead and Cyclops imprisoned, although Havok doubts his ability to fulfill such a role.

The Celestials destroyed Earth and mutants were relocated to 'Planet X' by the machinations of Eimin—one of the children of the Celestial-infected Archangel and the latest Horseman of Pestilence. Havok married the Wasp (Janet van Dyne) and they had a daughter, Katie, but Katie is lost when she is captured by Kang the Conqueror after he helps the team avert this timeline by projecting their minds back into their past selves. Although Alex is left disfigured after the battle, he and Janet remain together, and are contacted by Immortus, who informs them that he can return their daughter to them if they take action at the right time and place to conceive her, but also warns them about the imminent threat posed by the Red Skull.

During the AXIS storyline, the Red Skull and Scarlet Witch accidentally morally invert various heroes and villains. Havok is among those affected by the inversion spell. He resigns from the Avengers Unity Division and reconciles with his brother. Havok remains corrupted after the other heroes and villains are returned to normal, where Havok and Sabretooth have been unintentionally 'protected' from the reversion by a shield generated by Iron Man, prompting him to join Cyclops' team after using the Wasp as a hostage to escape.

All-New, All-Different Marvel
Unlike Iron Man (who was apparently restored to normal after reality was reconstructed after the Incursions) and Sabretooth (who remained inverted but whose true persona began to reassert itself), Havok simply remained inverted. Havok and Emma Frost are later seen observing the funeral of his brother Cyclops from afar. Because he does not believe his brother had become suicidal at all and was convinced that Scott was actually alive but in hiding, Emma tells him the truth about what truly happened in the confrontation with the Inhumans. Emma takes Alex to see his brother's dead body and reveals that Scott was one of the victims of the Terrigenesis clouds. She used a telepathic projection of him to rally mutant attempts to destroy a Terrigenesis cloud, subsequently faking his death in a final confrontation with Black Bolt.

After the truth of Emma's actions is revealed at the conclusion of the war against the Inhumans, which ended with Medusa destroying the Terrigenesis cloud to save the mutants, Havok saves Emma when the mutants and the Inhumans turn on her. Havok makes it clear that he is only doing this out of respect for his brother's memory and his old feelings for Emma rather than forgiving her for what she did to Cyclops' reputation. Havok then began working with the White Queen, Bastion, and Miss Sinister to infect the world’s population with the Mothervine virus, thereby making mutants the dominant species on the planet until he was eventually inverted back to his normal self by Emma Frost and Lorna Dane, and Elixir soon afterward cured his scars.

Dawn of X
In the new status quo for mutants post-House of X and Powers of X, Professor X and Magneto invite all mutants to live on Krakoa and welcome even former enemies into their fold. He spends some time with his family in the Summer House, the new residence of the Summers Family, located on the Moon.

Later, he joins a loose group of outcast mutants, operating under Mister Sinister: the Hellions, which also comprise Wild Child, Kwannon, Empath, John Greycrow, Nanny, and Orphan Maker.

Powers and abilities
Havok is a mutant possessing the power to absorb ambient cosmic energy, process it, and emanate it from his body as waves of energy that heat the air in their path, turning it into plasma in the form of a beam with a tell-tale concentric circle pattern. These waves will emanate from his body in all directions unless he purposefully tries to channel them in a single direction, usually along the length of his arms. This results in control over an extremely powerful sort of destructive force. He is immune to the adverse effects of most forms of radiation and heat. In the past, he was not entirely able to control this ability, which made him a danger to those around him unless he wore a special containment suit equipped with special sensors for measuring and controlling his power output. Havok is immune to his own powers and to those of his brother Scott. He is resistant but not immune to Vulcan's powers.

Despite past accounts, the energy that Havok releases is not truly a concussive force. When Havok strikes an object with hot plasma, the sudden temperature jump often causes objects to shatter or disintegrate. Should Havok direct his energy at the lowest level, he can project it toward a human being and his target will suffer a severe headache but will not burn up.

While his absorption capabilities are normally passive, he can also willingly absorb, store, and re-process various other energies from other sources through conscious force of will (such as starlight, x-rays, and gamma radiation). He once absorbed the whole energies of a collapsing star to fight his brother Vulcan, and actually beat the Hulk twice, once with a tightly focused beam to the forehead,  and once by absorbing parts of his gamma energy during an invasion of Transia.

Nonetheless, Havok's body is constantly absorbing cosmic radiation. When his body reaches its capacity, excess energy is then immediately re-emitted in negligible quantities. The circle on his chest is an indicator of how much energy he has left. Upon the expenditure of all his available energy, it takes Havok about 17 hours to recharge to peak level under normal circumstances. The concentration involved in releasing his energy in focused beams is exhausting for Havok, especially if he does it over an extended period.

Havok can also use stored energy for flight by directing it as a downward thrust. At full energy capacity, he has an easier time managing his energized propulsion through his powers. By emanating plasma from his body in directed waves, he can form a sort of shield against projectile weapons for a short time.

Havok has demonstrated immunity to his brother Cyclops's optic beam. Similarly, Cyclops is immune to Havok's power.

Havok has the normal human strength, height, and build of a man who engages in intensive regular exercise. Havok is well-educated in the field of geophysical science, where he has earned a master's degree and completed some doctoral work, and he has been trained in hand-to-hand combat and martial arts by Wolverine. He is an instinctive tactician and strategist.

It was also revealed in the Mutant X and Exiles books that his body and mind were a nexus for all other Alex Summers in other realities and his very existence is sort of a "back door" to the others. This revelation caused the problem in the Uncanny X-Men and Exiles crossover. Not much more is known about his multidimensional status.

Reception
 In 2014, Entertainment Weekly ranked Havok 12th in their "Let's rank every X-Man ever" list.

Other versions

Age of Apocalypse
In the Age of Apocalypse continuity, Alex and his brother Scott are not separated after the plane crash but adopted together by Sinister. Raised together as the cream of the new mutant aristocracy in Apocalypse's America, the brothers, under the rank of Prelate, work to oversee their foster father's interests. Alex, being the more emotional and thus unstable of the two, loses ground in Sinister's eyes and watches with envy as his brother gains favor.

The two brothers reunite briefly with their real father, Christopher Summers, who has been kept in Sinister's medical labs. They discover that Christopher had been infected by the Brood and was transforming into the new Brood Queen, forcing Scott to kill him. Alex refuses to believe that there were no other options and blames his brother for their father's death.

Alex meets Lorna once, but they have no relationship other than that of jail warden and prisoner. The power-hungry Alex is arrogant about his powers both as a mutant and as a Prelate. He frequents the club which Angel owns, Heaven, and has an affair with the club's diva, a flatscan (or human) woman named Scarlett (presumably that reality's version of the woman who appeared in the Meltdown miniseries). Because of the antagonism between humans and mutants, they both must keep this affair a secret. Scarlett, it turns out, is a spy working for the Human High Council. Scarlett is arrested right after she discovers that she is pregnant with Alex's child.

At almost that moment, Alex has just recaptured Jean Grey to use against his brother, Scott. Indeed, when Jean was originally a prisoner, she had captivated Scott and inspired him to release other prisoners. Alex exposes his brother as a traitor by asking Scott to execute Jean Grey, which Scott refuses to do. Following this, Alex has Scott arrested and gives him over to the Dark Beast for experiments; however, Jean Grey and Scott escape. Alex tracks them down and knocks out his brother and seemingly kills Jean, but this action proves fatal for Alex when Weapon X takes vengeance on Jean's behalf.

Age of Ultron
When Wolverine kills Hank Pym to avert the future in which Ultron nearly annihilated the human race in the Age of Ultron reality, a new timeline where Morgan le Fay conquered half the world is created in which Havok relinquished his birthname and married Rogue. He worked as leader of the Morlocks until he was killed by Archangel's son Uriel of the Apocalypse Twins.

Marvel Zombies
In Ultimate Fantastic Four #23, Havok is seen as one of the zombies attacking the surviving humans.

Mys-Tech Wars
In the four-issue series Mys-Tech Wars, an alternate universe version of Havok, along with the rest of X-Factor, appear in order to assist the mainstream heroes in their battles. An enemy's energy bolt pierces Havok through the neck, killing him instantly.

New Exiles
On the world of the Sons of Iron and Daughters of the Dragon, the New Exiles face a squad of alternate 'core X-Men' who are loyal to Lilandra. These X-Men include an alternate version of Alex who is codenamed 'Warshot'. Alex is covered from head to toe in battle armor and combines his mutant powers with his weaponry.

Ultimate Marvel
In the Ultimate Marvel continuity of Ultimate X-Men, Alex Summers, a.k.a. Havok, is the headstrong, brash field leader of the Academy of Tomorrow, the mutant peacekeeping squad of Emma Frost. In this incarnation, he is the boyfriend and teammate of Polaris.

In this incarnation, he also is the brother of Cyclops. As in the mainstream comics, their powers are useless on each other. However, there are several key differences: first, Alex is sometimes called the older brother and other times called the younger brother; second, in this world, Alex and Scott are frequently at odds with each other, both ideologically and physically; and third, neither seems interested in mending this rift. Ideologically, their rift was evidenced by Alex's affiliation with Emma Frost's Academy of Tomorrow. There is also more than one reference to their physical competition over Polaris. In one case, Alex even knocked out Scott with a wrench, though he states that this was because Scott let him. The two have shown to help each other in great danger, but in general, they have a lot of sibling issues separating them.

During the Ultimatum event, the Academy of Tomorrow is attacked and everyone inside is killed by Madrox, but Alex's body isn't found and he is listed as missing in action after the end of the event. Alex is later revealed not only to be alive but also a patient in Kennerman Acres mental institute; he suffers from amnesia but has recollections of an explosion and his only company is an imaginary version of his brother Scott. Alex is eventually found by Nathaniel Essex (who can see the imaginary version of Scott) and brought to Roxxon where Essex introduces him to Layla Miller as one of the four mutants they needed for their unknown plans.

X-Men: The End
In the alternate future X-Men: The End, Carter creates an illusion that he is still a child and Havok and Annie are together. Both Havok and Annie are killed prior to the beginning of the series.

In other media

Television
 Havok appears in X-Men: The Animated Series, voiced by an uncredited voice actor. This version is a member of X-Factor who is romantically involved with Polaris and does not display an explicit connection to Cyclops.
 Havok appears in X-Men: Evolution, voiced by Matt Hill. This version was adopted by the Masters family and comes off as a stereotypical "surfer dude". Additionally, his powers manifest as red energy blasts. In the two-part season one finale "The Cauldron", Havok reunites with Cyclops and forms a bond with him before Magneto recruits him into his Acolytes and uses the Gem of Cyttorak to enhance his powers. Upon realizing Magneto is using him, Havok joins forces with Cyclops and the X-Men to defeat Magneto, losing his enhancements in the process. Though he is offered membership into the X-Men, Havok declines in favor of pursuing professional surfing. In the two-part series finale "Ascension", Havok rejoins the X-Men to defeat Apocalypse.
 Havok was meant to appear in Wolverine and the X-Men before the series was cancelled.

Film
 Alex Summers appears in X-Men: First Class, portrayed by Lucas Till. This version was imprisoned in a government prison within solitary confinement due to his powers until he is recruited by Charles Xavier and Erik Lehnsherr to combat the Hellfire Club. After indirectly killing fellow recruit Darwin, Alex works to control his powers with help from Xavier and Hank McCoy despite initial difficulty and helps the future X-Men defeat the Hellfire Club.
 Alex Summers appears in X-Men: Days of Future Past, portrayed again by Lucas Till. Following the X-Men's disbandment, he joined a special division of the U.S. Army and took part in the Vietnam War. Alex and his division are nearly captured by William Stryker on Bolivar Trask's behalf, but Mystique rescues them and sends them back to the U.S.
 Alex Summers appears in X-Men: Apocalypse, portrayed again by Lucas Till. After escorting his younger brother Scott Summers to Xavier after Scott's powers manifest, Alex destroys Cerebro to prevent Apocalypse from using it, though he inadvertently destroys the X-Mansion and is later considered missing-in-action despite Peter Maximoff's best efforts.

Video games
 Havok appeared as a playable character in X-Men: Mutant Academy 2, voiced by Rod Wilson.
 Havok appeared as a playable character in X-Men II: The Fall of the Mutants.
 Havok appeared as a playable character in X-Men: Mojo World.
 Havok appeared as a playable character in X-Men: Next Dimension, voiced by Wally Wingert.
 Havok appeared as a supporting character in Wolverine.
 Havok appears as an NPC and unlockable playable character in X-Men Legends, voiced by Matt Nolan. This version is initially a member of the Brotherhood of Mutants until he eventually develops second thoughts, is imprisoned by the Blob for mutiny, and freed by the X-Men, whom he defects to.
 Havok appears as an NPC in X-Men Legends II: Rise of Apocalypse, voiced by Scott Holst. As of this game, he now serves as the X-Men's pilot.
 Havok appears as a boss in the PS3 and Xbox 360 versions of Marvel: Ultimate Alliance 2, voiced by Jason Zumwalt. This version supports Captain America in opposing the Superhuman Registration Act.
 Havok appears as a playable character in Marvel Super Hero Squad Online, voiced by Travis Willingham.
 Havok appears as an unlockable character in Marvel: Avengers Alliance.
 Havok clones appear in Deadpool. The Havok clones fire yellow energy balls instead of the traditional blue.
 Havok appears in Marvel Heroes, voiced by Liam O'Brien.
 Havok appears in Lego Marvel Super Heroes, voiced by Greg Cipes.
 Havok appears as a playable character in Marvel Puzzle Quest.

Collected editions

References

External links
 Havok at Marvel.com
 

Avengers (comics) characters
Characters created by Arnold Drake
Characters created by Don Heck
Comics characters introduced in 1969
Fictional characters from Alaska
Fictional characters from Hawaii
Fictional characters with absorption or parasitic abilities
Fictional characters with energy-manipulation abilities
Male characters in film
Marvel Comics film characters
Marvel Comics male superheroes
Marvel Comics martial artists
Marvel Comics mutants
Marvel Comics orphans
Superheroes who are adopted
X-Factor (comics)
X-Men members